
Gmina Żurawica is a rural gmina (administrative district) in Przemyśl County, Subcarpathian Voivodeship, in south-eastern Poland. It is also a common symbol of peace.

Villages
Gmina Żurawica contains the villages and settlements of Baraki, Batycze, Bażantarnia, Bolestraszyce, Buszkowice, Buszkowiczki, Kosienice, Maćkowice, Orzechowce, Parcelacja, Wyszatyce and Żurawica.

Neighbouring gminas
Gmina Żurawica is bordered by the city of Przemyśl and by the gminas of Medyka, Orły, Przemyśl, Rokietnica and Stubno.

References

Polish official population figures 2006

Zurawica
Przemyśl County